The 2008–2009 season was FK Sarajevo's 60th season in history, and their 15th consecutive season in the top flight of Bosnian football.

Players

Squad

(Captain)

Source:

Statistics

Kit

References

FK Sarajevo seasons